Lieutenant-general Baron Jules-Marie-Alphonse Jacques de Dixmude (24 February 1858 – 24 November 1928), often known as General Jacques, was a Belgian military figure of World War I and colonial advocate.

Congo Free State

He founded Albertville (Kalemie) in the Congo in 1892.

Jacques was known for contributing to the brutality of the Congo Free State rule. After hearing that native Congolese forced laborers were severing vines instead of tapping them as ordered, he wrote to one of his subordinates: "Decidedly these people of [Inongo] are a bad lot. They have just been and cut some rubber vines...We must fight them until their absolute submission has been obtained, or their complete extermination...Inform the natives that if they cut another single vine, I will exterminate them to the last man."

Military career

Congo Arab war

From 1886–1892, the Society of Missionaries of Africa had founded catholic missions at the north and south ends of Lake Tanganyika. Léopold Louis Joubert, a French soldier and armed auxiliary, was dispatched by Archbishop Charles Lavigerie's Society of Missionaries of Africa to protect the missionaries. The missionaries abandoned three of the new stations due to attacks by Tippu Tip and Rumaliza. By 1891 the Zanzibari slavers had control of the entire western shore of the lake, apart from the region defended by Joubert around Mpala and St Louis de Mrumbi. The anti-slavery expedition under captain Jacques—financed by the Belgian Anti-Slavery Society—came to the relief of Joubert on 30 Oktober 1892. When the Jacques expedition arrived Joubert's garrison was down to about two hundred men, poorly armed with "a most miscellaneous assortment of chassepots, Remingtons and muzzle-loaders, without suitable cartridges". He also had hardly any medicine left. Captain Jacques asked Joubert to remain on the defensive while his expedition moved north. On 3 January 1892, captain Jacques' anti-slavery expedition founded the fortress of Albertville on the shores of Lake Tanganyika, and tried to put an end to the slave trade in the region. Rumaliza's troops surrounded Albertville on 5 April and besieged the outpost for 9 months. Eventually Rumaliza's forces had to retreat because of the arrival of the Long-Duvivier-Demol Anti-Slavery expedition, a relief column sent from Brussels at captain Jacques's aide. In 1894 he returns to Belgium, he serves as a colonial official in the Congo Free State from 1895 to 1898 and finally returns to the Congo Free State in 1902 to work on the railway line that connects Bas-Congo to Katanga.

World War I

Jacques was promoted to major in the Belgian army in 1908, lieutenant colonel in 1913 and colonel in 1914 as he took command of the 12th regiment.
He obtained the rank of major general in 1915 and became a three-star general in 1916, taking command of the 3rd army division. Because of his exceptional service during World War I, he was made Baron and received several decorations.

Title, honours and arms 
Jacques was promoted to the rank of lieutenant general in 1916 and was made a baron in 1919 by HM King Albert I. In 1924 he was allowed to add "de Dixmude" to his last name.

Military awards and decorations

 Grand cordon of the order of Leopold with palm
 Commander of the order of the African star
 Commander of the order of the crown
 Knight of the royal order of the lion
 War cross WWI with palm
 Yser medal
 WWI Victory medal
 WW I commemorative medal
 The Arab campaign medal
 Military cross, first class
 Service star
 Commemorative medal of the reign of King Leopold II
 Knight grand cross of the order of St Michael and St George
 Grand cross of the order of St Anne (Russia)
 Knight grand cross of the order of the star of Karađorđe with swords (Serbia)
 Grand officer of the legion of honor (France)
 Commander of the order saints Maurice and Lazarus (Italy)
 Silver medal for military valor (Italy)
 Distinguished service medal (United States)
 War cross with palm (France)
 8 front bars
 1 wound bar

Commemoration

"General Jacques" is commemorated by several streets, statues, and monuments around Belgium, including the "Boulevard Général Jacques" in Brussels as well as others in Nivelles, Chaudfontaine and Verviers and numerous statues. A bas-relief of Baron Jacques is included as part of the Liberty Memorial in Kansas City.

Arms

References

External links

 Archive Jules Jacques de Dixmude, Royal Museum for Central Africa
 
 

1858 births
1928 deaths
People from Stavelot
Belgian generals
City founders
Congo Free State officials
Commanders of the Order of the Crown (Belgium)
Recipients of the Croix de guerre (Belgium)
Grand Officiers of the Légion d'honneur
Recipients of the Croix de Guerre 1914–1918 (France)
Recipients of the Silver Medal of Military Valor
Walloon people
Barons of Belgium
Belgian Army generals of World War I
Belgian abolitionists